Kevin Verdoorn (born 24 July 1955) is a South African cricketer. He played in 83 first-class and 56 List A matches between 1972 and 1989.

References

External links
 

1955 births
Living people
South African cricketers
KwaZulu-Natal cricketers
Northerns cricketers
Place of birth missing (living people)